East Richmond railway station is located on the Richmond line, serving the Sydney suburb of Richmond. It is served by Sydney Trains T1 Western and T5 Cumberland line services.

History
East Richmond station opened on 2 July 1939.

Platforms & services
Historically, East Richmond has been served by services operating from Sydney CBD/North Shore, branching off the Western Line at Blacktown (under the service title of 'T1 Richmond). However, after a major timetable change for the Sydney Trains network on 26 November 2017, Cumberland line services started continuing out to Richmond, rather than terminating at Schofields, during the late night, taking over from the Richmond line.

Transport links
East Richmond station is served by one NightRide route:
N71: Richmond station to Town Hall station

References

External links

East Richmond station details Transport for New South Wales

Easy Access railway stations in Sydney
Railway stations in Sydney
Railway stations in Australia opened in 1939
Richmond railway line
Richmond, New South Wales